Ivey Hall is a historic building on the campus of Lincoln University in New Zealand. It is registered as a Category I structure by Heritage New Zealand.

The building was designed by Frederick Strouts and built between 1878 and 1880. Strouts modelled the design on Rothamsted Manor in Hertfordshire. Originally, it was used as an accommodation building for students and the director of the School of Agriculture. Later on, it became the university's library. In 1954, it was named after William Ivey (1838–1892), the inaugural head of the teaching institution. It is one of the earliest large buildings built in permanent materials in Canterbury and the earliest large structure in New Zealand of Jacobean architecture still in existence. It has been extended several times, with the 1881 extension designed by Strouts, the west wing was designed in 1918 by John Guthrie, and Cecil Wood designed the Memorial Hall in 1923.

Ivey Hall is registered by Heritage New Zealand as a Category I building with registration number 273. It was originally classified as B. It was badly damaged by the 2010 Canterbury earthquake.

References

Lincoln University (New Zealand)
Heritage New Zealand Category 1 historic places in Canterbury, New Zealand
Jacobean architecture